Carlos Miguel Beruff (born January 1, 1958)  is an American real estate developer and a Republican politician and donor. On March 1, 2017, Governor Rick Scott appointed him chair of the Florida Constitution Revision Commission, a body that meets once every 20 years to propose amendments to the Florida Constitution.

Previously, Beruff was a candidate for the U.S. Senate in 2016, but lost the Republican primary. He was a gubernatorial appointee to the Sarasota-Bradenton Airport Authority, the Southwest Florida West Management Board, and the State College of Florida board. Beruff was born in Miami, Florida, to Cuban-immigrant parents.

Medallion Home
In 1984, Beruff founded Medallion Home, a home builder located in Bradenton, Florida.

Gubernatorial appointments
In 2009, then-Florida Governor Charlie Crist appointed Beruff to the Sarasota-Bradenton Airport Authority, the Southwest Florida Water Management board, and the State College of Florida board. The next governor, Rick Scott, reappointed Beruff to all three positions. In the 2010 U.S. Senate election in Florida, Beruff supported Charlie Crist, who was running as an independent and later became a Democrat, over Republican Marco Rubio.

Resignation from Southwest Florida Water Management District board
In August 2015, Beruff resigned from the Southwest Florida Water Management District board after voting to approve a friend's plan to destroy an acre of wetlands for a development. An administrative law judge recommended against issuing the permit, which allowed developer Pat Neal to remove mangroves and fill wetlands in order to build a family compound on Perico Island.

2016 U.S. Senate campaign

Beruff ran for the U.S. Senate seat in Florida, mounting a primary challenge to Republican incumbent Marco Rubio in the 2016 election. Beruff has proposed temporarily halting immigration to the United States from Middle Eastern countries. In May 2016, Beruff was criticized for referring to President Barack Obama as "an animal". Beruff declined to issue an apology for the comments. He lost the August 30 primary, getting 18.49% of the vote and 264,427 votes.

References

External links
 Carlos Beruff for Senate

1958 births
20th-century American businesspeople
21st-century American businesspeople
American politicians of Cuban descent
American real estate businesspeople
Businesspeople from Miami
Candidates in the 2016 United States Senate elections
Florida Republicans
Living people
Stetson University alumni
University of South Florida alumni